Tyukanovo 2-ye (2-se Tökän) is a rural locality (a village) in Svobodinsky Selsoviet, Kuyurgazinsky District, Bashkortostan, Russia. The population was 439 as of 2010. There are 5 streets.

Geography 
Tyukanovo 2-ye is located 30 km west of Yermolayevo (the district's administrative centre) by road. Svoboda is the nearest rural locality.

References 

Rural localities in Kuyurgazinsky District